Bonita is an unincorporated community in north central Montague County, Texas, United States, north of U.S. Route 82 on Farm to Market Road 1815.

History
Bonita was established in 1886 with the construction of the Gainesville, Henrietta and Western Railway through northern Montague County. In 1887, Bonita received a post office and a train station. A bank was chartered in 1906. Fires, flooding and the construction of US highway 82 two miles south of town in the 1930s led to Bonita's demise. By the 1950s, the population had fallen to below 100, and the post office closed in 1967. In 1969, the railroad line was abandoned and the tracks were removed in 1971.

Education
The Bonita area is serviced by the Nocona Independent School District
and Saint Jo Independent School District.

Notable people
Wilcy Moore: pitcher for the New York Yankees

References

Unincorporated communities in Texas
Unincorporated communities in Montague County, Texas